China competed at the 2017 World Games in Wroclaw, Poland, from July 20, 2017 to July 30, 2017.

Competitors

Boules Sports
China has qualified at the 2017 World Games:

Lyonnaise Men's Singles Precision Shooting - 1 quota
Lyonnaise Men's Singles Progressive Shooting - 1 quota

Gymnastic

Trampoline
China has qualified at the 2017 World Games:

Men's Individual Tumbling - 1 quota 
Men's Synchronized Trampoline - 1 quota
Women's Individual Tumbling - 1 quota
Women's Synchronized Trampoline - 1 quota

Karate
China  has qualified at the 2017 World Games:

Women's Individual Kumite -61 kg - 1 quota

Korfball
China has qualified at the 2017 World Games in the Korfball Mixed Team event.

Tug of war 

China won the silver medal in the women's indoor 540 kg event.

References 

Nations at the 2017 World Games
2017 in Chinese sport
2017